was a legendary local ruler of Okinawa Island. Born as the second son of King Taisei, his mother’s name was unknown.

He was the third ruler of Eiso Dynasty; that is, his grandfather was King Eiso and his father was King Taisei. The five years of Eiji's reign were uneventful, but after his death, the island was split into three polities. Eiji was the father of Tamagusuku.

Notes

References
 Kerr, George H. (1965). Okinawa, the History of an Island People. Rutland, Vermont: C.E. Tuttle Co. OCLC  39242121
 Nussbaum, Louis-Frédéric. (2002).  Japan Encyclopedia. Cambridge: Harvard University Press. ; OCLC 48943301

1268 births
1313 deaths
Kings of Ryūkyū
13th-century Ryukyuan people
14th-century Ryukyuan people